The 2018 African Nations Championship qualification was a men's football competition which decided the participating teams of the 2018 African Nations Championship. Only national team players who were playing in their country's own domestic league were eligible to compete in the tournament.

A total of sixteen teams qualified to play in the final tournament.

Teams
A total of 48 (out of 54) CAF member national teams entered the qualifying rounds, split into zones according to their regional affiliations.

Notes
Teams in bold qualified for the final tournament.
Central African Republic were excluded by the CAF from participating because of their withdrawal against DR Congo in the 2016 African Nations Championship qualification.
Chad withdrew on 27 March 2016, but however, on 24 May 2016, Chad announced that they would not be able to qualify for CHAN 2018, and São Tomé and Príncipe officially entered the qualification, along with Equatorial Guinea.
Egypt were expected to withdraw from the CHAN 2018, but however, on 4 June 2016, it was announced that Egypt would participate in the CHAN 2018 qualification.
On 12 March 2017, the Football Association of Malawi announced their senior national football team would withdraw from the competition due to the lack of funding. However, they later announced its reversal of this decision and would continue to compete.
Kenya were the original hosts and would have qualified automatically. However, on 23 September 2017, the CAF decided to withdraw their hosting rights due to a lack of progress with preparations.
Morocco were named as the new hosts on 14 October 2017. Since they had already qualified in the North Zone, their spot in the final tournament was re-allocated to Egypt, which lost to Morocco in the North Zone final qualifying round. However, Egypt declined to participate citing a "congested domestic calendar". As a result, the spot was reverted to Central-East Zone (as originally three teams would participate including Kenya as original hosts), and would go to the winner of a play-off between Ethiopia and Rwanda, the two teams which lost in the Central-East Zone final qualifying round.

Schedule
The draw was held on 3 February 2017 at Libreville, Gabon.

The schedule of the qualifying rounds was as follows.

Format
Qualification ties were played on a home-and-away two-legged basis. If the aggregate score was tied after the second leg, the away goals rule would be applied, and if still level, the penalty shoot-out would be used to determine the winner (no extra time would be played).

North Zone
All four teams (Algeria, Egypt, Libya, Morocco) entered the first round.

First round
Winners qualify for 2018 African Nations Championship.

|}

Morocco won 4–2 on aggregate.

Libya won 3–2 on aggregate.

West A Zone
All eight teams (Gambia, Guinea, Guinea-Bissau, Liberia, Mali, Mauritania, Senegal, Sierra Leone) entered the first round.

First round

|}

Senegal won 4–2 on aggregate.

Guinea won 10–1 on aggregate.

Mauritania won 2–1 on aggregate.

Mali won 4–0 on aggregate.

Second round
Winners qualify for 2018 African Nations Championship.

|}

Guinea won 6–3 on aggregate.

Mauritania won 3–2 on aggregate.

West B Zone
Two teams (Benin, Togo) entered the first round.
Five teams (Burkina Faso, Ghana, Ivory Coast, Niger, Nigeria) entered the second round.

First round

|}

2–2 on aggregate. Benin won 8–7 on penalties.

Second round
Winners qualify for 2018 African Nations Championship.

|}

Nigeria won 2–1 on aggregate.

2–2 on aggregate. Ivory Coast won on away goals.

Burkina Faso won 4–3 on aggregate.

Central Zone
All six teams (Cameroon, Congo, DR Congo, Equatorial Guinea, Gabon, São Tomé and Príncipe) entered the first round.

First round
Winners qualify for 2018 African Nations Championship.

|}

Equatorial Guinea won on walkover after Gabon withdrew prior to the first leg.

1–1 on aggregate. Congo won on away goals.

Cameroon won 4–0 on aggregate.

Central-East Zone
Two teams (Somalia, South Sudan) entered the first round.
Seven teams (Burundi, Djibouti, Ethiopia, Rwanda, Sudan, Tanzania, Uganda) entered the second round.

First round

|}

South Sudan won 4–1 on aggregate.

Second round

|}

Uganda won 5–1 on aggregate.

1–1 on aggregate. Rwanda won on away goals.

Ethiopia won on walkover after Djibouti withdrew prior to the second leg.Sudan won 1–0 on aggregate.Third round
Winners qualify for 2018 African Nations Championship.

|}Uganda won 3–2 on aggregate.Sudan won 2–1 on aggregate.Play-off
Winner qualifies for 2018 African Nations Championship (replacing the original hosts Kenya which would have qualified automatically).

|}Rwanda won 3–2 on aggregate.South Zone
Four teams (Madagascar, Malawi, Mauritius, Seychelles) entered the first round.
Ten teams (Angola, Botswana, Comoros, Lesotho, Mozambique, Namibia, South Africa, Swaziland, Zambia, Zimbabwe) entered the second round.

First round

|}Madagascar won 2–0 on aggregate.Mauritius won 3–2 on aggregate.Second round

|}Madagascar won 4–2 on aggregate.Angola won 4–2 on aggregate.Comoros win 2–1 on aggregate.1–1 on aggregate. Namibia won 5–4 on penalties.South Africa won 3–0 on aggregate.Zambia won 7–0 on aggregate.Third round
Winners qualify for 2018 African Nations Championship.

|}Angola won 1–0 on aggregate.Namibia won 3–2 on aggregate.Zambia won 4–2 on aggregate.''

Qualified teams
The following 16 teams qualified for the final tournament.

1 Bold indicates champions for that year. Italic indicates hosts for that year.

Goalscorers
8 goals

 Sékou Amadou Camara

4 goals

 Njiva Rakotoharimalala
 Getaneh Kebede
 Paul Mucureezi
 Justin Shonga

3 goals

 Ibrahima Koné
 Amadou Dia N'Diaye

2 goals

 Job
 Mohamed Sydney Sylla
 Mohamed Sorel Camara
 Mohamed N'Diaye
 Ibrahima Sory Sankhon
 Muaid Ellafi
 Muna Katupose
 Hendrik Somaeb
 Ryan Moon
 Gift Motupa
 Leon Uso Khamis
 James Moga
 Seif Teiri
 Koidjo Sewonou
 Muzamiru Mutyaba
 Derrick Nsibambi
 Clatous Chama
 Brian Mwila

1 goal

 Sofiane Bendebka
 Oussama Darfalou
 Geraldo
 Dani Massunguna
 Vá
 Waris Aboki
 Marcelin Koukpo
 Mama Seibou
 Herman Nikiema
 Ilasse Sawadogo
 Raphaël Messi Bouli
 Raymond Fosso
 Armel Lionel Ngondji
 Franck Pangop
 Raidou Boina Bacar
 Chadhuli Mradabi
 Ibroihim Youssouf
 Mohamed Youssouf
 Jaures Ngombe
 ?
 Jean-Marc Makusu Mundele
 Ahmed El Sheikh
 Aschalew Girma
 Mulualem Mesfin
 Abdurahman Mubarak
 Abubakher Sanni
 Sadick Adams
 Felix Addo
 Gideon Waja
 Seydouba Bissiri Camara
 Mamady Diawara
 Juca
 Fabius Dosso
 Banfa Sylla
 Raboama Koloti
 Christopher Jackson
 Bela
 Morelin Raveloarisona
 Aboubacar Diarra
 Mandala Konté
 Gouné Niangadou
 Boubacar Bagili
 Mohamed Yaly Dellahi
 Abdoulaye Sileye Gaye
 Karamogho Moussa
 Moussa Samba
 Marco Dorza
 Jonathan Édouard
 Emmanuel Vincent Jean
 Kevin Perticots
 Francis Rasolofonirina
 Badr Banoun
 Badr Boulahroud
 Jawad El Yamiq
 Abderrahim Makran
 Maninho
 Salomão
 Idrissa Halidou Garba
 Imrana Seyni
 Rabiu Ali
 Kingsley Eduwo
 Abeddy Biramahire
 Muhadjiri Hakizimana
 Thierry Manzi
 Yannick Mukunzi
 Dominique Savio Nshuti
 Eric Rutanga
 Sidy Bara Diop
 Daouda Guèye Diémé
 Assane Mbodj
 Alassane Ndao
 Leeroy Corallie
 Yannick Manoo
 Kemson Fofanah
 Nathaniel Fullah
 Abas Amin Mohamed
 Elsamani Saadeldin
 Mario Booysen
 Duku Wurube
 Himid Mao
 Fackson Kapumbu
 Martin Phiri
 Simon Silwimba
 Prince Dube

Own goals

 Chamseddine Rahmani (against Libya)
 Hamza Semmoumy (against Egypt)

Notes

References

External links
Total African Nations Championship Qualifiers 2018, CAFonline.com
2018 CHAN Qualifiers, AfricanFootball.com

2018
Qualification
2017 in African football
April 2017 sports events in Africa
July 2017 sports events in Africa
August 2017 sports events in Africa
November 2017 sports events in Africa